Linda Carter Sobell, Ph.D., ABPP, is the President's Distinguished Professor at Nova Southeastern University (NSU) in Fort Lauderdale, Florida. She is a professor of clinical psychology, addiction specialist, co-director of NSU's Guided Self-Change clinic, a Motivational Interviewing Trainer, and is board-certified in cognitive and behavioral psychology.

Sobell has been recognized nationally and internationally for her research in the addictions field including brief motivational interventions, self-change, and the Timeline Followback. She is a Fellow in the American Psychological Association (APA) in Divisions  1, 3, 12, 25, 28, 38, and 50, the Canadian Psychological Association, American Association of Applied and Preventive Psychology, and Association for Behavioral and Cognitive Therapy.

Sobell is the former president of the Society of Clinical Psychology of the APA and Association for Behavioral and Cognitive Therapies.

Education 
Sobell earned her Ph.D. in psychology from the University of California at Irvine in 1976 with a dissertation entitled "The validity of self-reports: Towards a predictive model". Before that, she had earned a Bachelor of Arts in Psychology and Linguistics as a double major in 1970, followed by a Master of Arts in Social Sciences in 1974, all from the University of California at Irvine.

Certifications, Credentials and Licensures 
1976–1979 Certified Professional Counselor, Professional Alcohol & Drug Counselors of Tennessee, Certificate No. 119

1977–1980 Certified Substance Abuse Counselor, Tennessee Department of Mental Health and Mental Retardation, Certificate No. 0 026

1978–1981 Licensed Psychologist, Tennessee. Certificate No. P.645 1981–1997 Registered Psychologist, Ontario (Canada). Certificate No.1478

1996–2014 Fellow, American Academy of Cognitive and Behavioral Psychology.

1996–present Board Certified in Behavioral and Cognitive Psychology, American Board of Professional Psychology. Diploma Number 4789, awarded 12/04/96.

1997–present Licensed Psychologist, Florida. License No. PY 0005690.

1999–present MINT (Motivational Interviewing Network of Trainers) Trainer.

Awards 
 President's Distinguished Professor at Nova Southeastern University
 2006 Betty Ford Award from the Association for Medical Education and Research in Substance Abuse (AMERSA)
 Norman E. Zinberg Memorial Lecture Award
 2014 Jellinek Memorial Award from the Jellinek Memorial Fund (Jellinek Award)
 for outstanding contributions to knowledge in the field of alcohol studies
 2008 Charles C. Shepard Science Award (About Charles C. Shepard Award) from the Centers for Disease Control and Prevention and the Agency for Toxic Substances and Disease Registry
 for the most outstanding peer-reviewed research paper prevention and control by CDC scientists
 2010 Distinguished Scientific Contributions to Clinical Psychology Award, Society of Clinical Psychology of American Psychological Association
 2018 Lifetime Achievement Award, Association for Behavioral and Cognitive Therapies, Addictive Behaviors Special Interest Group

Timeline Followback (TLFB) 
Sobell began using the Timeline Followback (TLFB) method in her research in the 1970's, publishing evidence of the TLFB's validity and reliability for alcohol use through the 70's and 80's. In 1992, Linda published the user manual describing the approach and validation work for the TLFB as applied to alcohol use patterns Since then, the TLFB has been expanded as an assessment for cannabis, cocaine, smoking, and other substance use behaviors. The TLFB is one of the most highly regarded psychometric methods for obtaining retrospective reports of substance use behaviors. Both the FDA and European Monitoring Centre for Drugs and Drug Addiction recommend the TLFB for measuring alcohol use.

The TLFB is a semi-structured interview that uses a calendar prompt and other memory aids (e.g., holidays, payday, and other personally relevant dates) to facilitate accurate recall of the number of drinks  (or substance use occasions) consumed each day during a given target period (e.g.,7– 28 days). In alcohol clinical trials, the TLFB is administered at baseline (e.g. with a 30- to 90-day recall period) and then multiple times during the treatment period (often weekly, biweekly, or monthly, depending on the length of the trial). A variety of drinking endpoints can be derived from the daily number of drinks captured by the TLFB; these include the FDA-recommended endpoints (percentage of subjects abstinent and the percentage of subjects with no heavy drinking days), as well as the new World Health Organization (WHO) risk drinking endpoints, among others (e.g. percent drinking days, percent heavy drinking days, drinks per day, and drinks per drinking day).

Guided Self-Change Treatment Model for Substance Use 
Drs. Linda Sobell and Mark Sobell established the Guided Self-Change (GSC) model for treating substance use disorders while working as professors at the University of Toronto, Canada in 1984. The GSC is a brief, motivational cognitive-behavioral harm reduction treatment designed to offer an alternative to abstinent only treatment programs such as Alcoholics Anonymous or 12 steps. The GSC approach has been shown to improve recovery outcomes in several clinical trials and was recognized by the Surgeon General's report on Facing Addiction in America (November 2016) as an appropriate treatment for individuals who have mild alcohol or drug problems.

By the 1970's a considerable amount of research began to appear demonstrating that alcohol problems occurred on a continuum ranging from mild to severe, mild cases of alcohol problems were more prevalent than severe cases, and alcohol problems were not necessarily progressive (i.e., problems did not always worsen without treatment or intervention). At the time, the traditional views held that 'low-severity' alcohol problems were simply in the 'early stages' of an irreversible course to severe 'alcoholism' which required anyone with any alcohol problems to be treated with intensive-inpatient facilities. However, research did not endorse that view or the efficacy of such expensive, disruptive, and intensive treatment programs for all alcohol users which inspired the Sobells to develop a cheaper, briefer, and less disruptive treatment program that more people could benefit from. Drawing from research in England on brief interventions for individuals with alcohol use disorder (Orford & Edwards, 1977; Orford, Oppenheimer, & Edwards, 1976), their own work on 'natural recovery' (i.e., recovery from alcohol use problems without formalized treatment; L. C. Sobell, Sobell, & Toneatto, 1992), and emerging work on motivational interviewing (MI) to change behavior (Miller, 1983), the Sobells started to form a new theoretical and treatment model for alcohol use.

One of the most innovative aspects of the GSC model and treatment program is the incorporation of moderation and harm reduction goals over abstinence only. The research at the time suggested that individuals with alcohol related problems preferred non-abstinence goals and that treatments allowing for moderation would increase their motivation to seek treatment than the abstinence only treatment as usual options of the time. By extension, another important difference of the GSC approach is the conceptualization of 'relapse prevention'. Where abstinent only models treat any post-quit drink as a treatment failure which occur due to a lack of skills, the GSC approach assumes that most people have the skills and resources to achieve a successful outcome (as defined by the client) and the goal of treatment is to mobilize those skills.

According to the Sobells:"Although GSC is similar to other cognitive-behavioral brief interventions for alcohol problems, it also is unique in several ways. First, GSC explicitly allows clients to choose their goal. Second, it routinely uses self-monitoring logs as a clinical procedure, for data collection, and to provide clients feedback in terms of changes in substance use. Third, it includes a cognitive relapse prevention component to provide a realistic perspective on recovery and management of goal violations. Fourth, it is flexible rather than being fixed in its structure (clients can request additional sessions after basic sessions have been completed). Fifth, it includes a planned after care telephone contact 1 month after the last treatment session. Finally, GSC uses brief readings for its decisional balance and problem-solving components."

"The GSC approach has been refined and extended to various populations and settings over the years. However, the following elements have been used in most GSC studies: (a) a motivational interviewing style, (b) provision of personalized feedback, (c) brief readings and homework assignments (e.g., decisional balance, problem solving), (d) self-monitoring of substance use, (e) clients select their own goals (with the exception of clients mandated to treatment), and (f) cognitive relapse prevention."

Guided Self-Change Healthy Lifestyles Program 
From the Guided Self-Change Healthy Lifestyles Program Website:"The Guided Self-Change (GSC) Healthy Lifestyles outpatient program at Nova Southeastern University's (NSU) College of Psychology offers a unique short-term, evidence-based, non-12 step alternative treatment not available elsewhere in Florida. The GSCC program has been recognized in the Surgeon General's report Facing Addiction in America (November 2016) as an appropriate treatment for individuals who have mild alcohol or drug problems. It also is included  the American Psychological Association's (APA) Division 12 (Society of Clinical Psychology) website listing of Empirically Supported Treatments."

"Services are offered for individuals concerned about their use of alcohol, other drugs (prescribed and non-prescribed), and tobacco products. The program also offers services for individuals who want to develop a healthier lifestyle, lose weight, exercise more, quit smoking cigarettes, quit gambling, deal with sleep difficulties, and reduce internet or video game use. This evidence-based, motivational harm reduction program empowers people to take responsibility for their own change and utilize personal strengths for setting and achieving goals."

Though developed in English, services have since been translated to be administered in Spanish. The number of sessions is variable and is determined by individual needs.

Books 
All by Linda Carter Sobell and Mark B. Sobell unless stated:
 Group Therapy for Substance Use Disorders: A Motivational Cognitive-Behavioral Approach (2011), Guilford Press, 
 Assessing Alcohol Problems Using Motivational Interviewing (2008 DVD), APA Psychotherapy Training Videos, 
 Problem Drinkers: Guided Self-Change Treatment (1993) The Guilford Press  / Free Psychotherapy eBooks (International Psychotherapy Institute), 
 Emerging Concepts of Alcohol Dependence  with Pattison, E. Mansell (2nd, 1977), New York: Springer Pub. Co., 
 Behavioral Treatment of Alcohol Problems: Individualized Therapy and Controlled Drinking (1977), New York: Springer Science+Business Media, 
 Evaluating Alcohol and Drug Abuse Treatment Effectiveness: Recent for Alcohol Problems: A Dialogue with Elliott Ward (1980) Elsevier Inc.,

See also 
Harm reduction
Guided self-change
Timeline Followback

References 

American women psychologists
Clinical psychologists
Nova Southeastern University faculty
University of California, Irvine alumni
Year of birth missing (living people)
Living people
American women academics
21st-century American women
American clinical psychologists